was a Japanese politician who served as Japan's Minister for Foreign Affairs in 1994.
 After his death, he had been conferred as Junior Third Rank, Grand Cordon of the Order of the Rising Sun.

After graduating from the University of Tokyo, Faculty of Economics, Kakizawa  worked as a bureaucrat within the Ministry of Finance before entering politics. During his enrollment in the ministry, Kakizawa was transferred to the Ministry of Foreign Affairs and Economic Planning Agency. He was first elected to the House of Councillors in 1977 as a member of the New Liberal Club (NLC), which is now defunct. He moved to the House of Representatives of Japan beginning in 1980. Kakizawa then left the NLC in order to join the Liberal Democratic Party (LDP).

In 1994, Kakizawa defected from the Liberal Democratic Party (LDP) in order to help found the now-defunct Liberal Party that same year. He held the post of Foreign Minister of Japan for about two months in 1994 within the coalition government of Prime Minister Tsutomu Hata. Hata's government had excluded the LDP from power.

Kakizawa rejoined the Liberal Democratic Party (LDP) in 1995.

Kakizawa unsuccessfully ran for Governor of Tokyo in the 1999 election after being expelled from the LDP.  He continued to serve a total of seven terms within the Japanese House of Representatives until his retirement in 2003.

Koji Kakizawa died of esophagus cancer on January 27, 2009, at the age of 75 at a hospital in Tokyo. His son Mito Kakizawa became a member of the Diet later that year.

References 

1933 births
2009 deaths
University of Tokyo alumni
Foreign ministers of Japan
Members of the House of Representatives (Japan)
Deaths from cancer in Japan
New Liberal Club politicians
Liberal Democratic Party (Japan) politicians
Liberal League (Japan) politicians
Tokyo gubernatorial candidates